Bilo is a town in central Ethiopia.

Bilo may also refer to:

 Bilo, Dobrich Province, Bulgaria
 Bilo (Dimitrovgrad), Serbia
 Bilo (music), a percussion instrument
 William C. Bilo (born 1944), United States Army Brigadier General

See also

 BI-LO (disambiguation)